The Ministry of Infrastructure and Housing (Portuguese: Ministério das Infraestruturas e da Habitação) is a Portuguese government ministry.

Ministers 

 Pedro Nuno Santos
 Marina Gonçalves

References

External links 

  

Portugal
Portugal
Environment

Ministries established in 2019
2019 establishments in Portugal